NGC 65 (ESO 473-10A/PGC 1229) is a lenticular galaxy in the constellation Cetus. Its apparent magnitude is 13.4. It was first discovered in 1886, and is also known as PGC 1229.

See also 
 List of NGC objects
 List of galaxies
 New General Catalogue

References

External links 
 

?
Cetus (constellation)
Lenticular galaxies
473-10A
-04-02-001
0065
01229